Prasophyllum milfordense is a species of orchid endemic to Tasmania. It has a single tubular, dark green leaf and up to thirty greenish-brown, white and purplish flowers. It is a very rare orchid, only found in a single location with a population of around 240 plants.

Description
The edges of the upturned part of the labellum are slightly wavy and there is a fleshy green, channelled callus in its centre. Flowering occurs from late October to early December.

Taxonomy and naming
Prasophyllum milfordense was first formally described in 1998 by David Jones from a specimen collected near Cambridge and the description was published in Australian Orchid Research. The specific epithet (milfordense) refers to the name of the private property where the species is found.

Distribution and habitat
The Milford leek orchid grows in grassland in an area near Hobart with below average rainfall for the state.

Conservation
Prasophyllum milfordense is only known from a small area of a single private property and in 2012, the total population was estimated to be 240 plants. In some drought years, no plants are seen. It is classed as "Endangered" under the Tasmanian Threatened Species Protection Act 1995 and as Critically Endangered under the Commonwealth Government Environment Protection and Biodiversity Conservation Act 1999 (EPBC) Act. The main threats to the population are the activities of rabbits, land clearance, inappropriate fire regimes and changes to rainfall patterns.

References

External links 
 

milfordense
Flora of Tasmania
Endemic orchids of Australia
Plants described in 1998